Pain is the fourth album by American Christian rock band The Letter Black. The album was released on May 26, 2017. This is the first album under the band's current name to be released independently.

Overview 
On November 19, 2016, the band previewed a new song on their Facebook page for their upcoming fourth studio album which will be released by early 2017. According to the band, this will be their heaviest album to date. They announced that they had left Tooth & Nail Records and would record their next album independently. The band ran a successful $25,000 Kickstarter campaign to record the album. On February 7, 2017, they released a full-length demo for the album. The band signed with EMP Label Group on March 14, 2017. They announced that the album title would be Pain and the cover art was also revealed. The first single, "Last Day That I Cared", was premiered on Revolver on April 28, 2017. A lyric video for "Rock's Not Dead", was premiered via Facebook on May 19, 2017.

Critical reception 
The album received generally positive reviews. Mary Nikkel, staff editor of New Release Today, wrote, "Pain sees The Letter Black navigating into a heavier rock sound with a sense of renewed energy and intensity that lends fire to the lyrical themes of fighting back against anything preventing us from reaching hope." She noticed that the "album packed with fight songs". She mentioned the track "Last Day That I Cared" as an "anthem pushing back against the harmful opinions of others as well as against our own internal demons..." CCM magazine said, "No noticeable drop-off's [sic] in production value, and the band really sounds as if they’ve rejuvenated their efforts just for you." It later praised the track "Last Day That I Cared". Rob J of Indie Vision Music calls the album "a blistering array of songs that are sure to please just about anyone who is into hard rock."

Track listing

Personnel 
All credits from Allmusic.
The Letter Black
 Mark Anthony - lead and rhythm guitar, vocals, engineer, producer, programming ,bass 
 Sarah Anthony - lead and unclean vocals
 Justin Brown - drums

Addition personnel
 Jay Pfeifer - string arrangements
 Paul Pavão, Ben Grosse - mixing
 Ted Jensen - mastering
 Rick Fike - artwork, digital editing
 Brandon Hay - assistant arranger
 Natascha Pehur - photography

Charts

References 

2017 albums
The Letter Black albums